Billy Mitchell is a pyroclastic shield in the central part of the island of Bougainville, just north-east of the Bagana Volcano in Papua New Guinea. It is a small pyroclastic shield truncated by a 2 km wide caldera filled by a crater lake. It is named after Billy Mitchell, a 20th-century United States Army general who is regarded as the father of the United States Air Force.

The last two major eruptions were in 1580 AD ± 20 years and about 1030 AD. They were among the largest Holocene eruptions in Papua New Guinea. Both were explosive eruptions with a Volcanic Explosivity Index of at least 5. The 1580 AD ± 20 years eruption produced pyroclastic flows and probably formed its caldera.

Caldera lake 
Billy Mitchell caldera lake is about 1,013 m above sea level, has total  surface area , and the maximum depth  approximately 88.3  m. The only fish species  in the lake is  the eel Anguilla megastoma. 
Billy Mitchell lake drains into the Tekan River.

See also
 List of volcanoes in Papua New Guinea
 Mount Billy Mitchell (Chugach Mountains)
 Timeline of volcanism on Earth

References

External links
 Photo of the Billy Mitchell Crater Lake
 

Mountains of Papua New Guinea
Volcanoes of Bougainville Island
Lakes of Papua New Guinea
Pyroclastic shields
Volcanic crater lakes
VEI-6 volcanoes
16th-century volcanic events
Shield volcanoes of Papua New Guinea